The gare d'Orthez is a railway station in Orthez, Nouvelle-Aquitaine, France. The station is located on the Toulouse - Bayonne railway line. The station is served by TGV (high speed trains), Intercités de Nuit (night trains), Intercités (long distance) and TER (local) services operated by the SNCF.

Train services
The following services currently call at Orthez:
intercity services (Intercités) Hendaye - Bayonne - Pau - Tarbes - Toulouse
night services (Intercités de nuit) Hendaye - Bayonne - Dax - Pau - Tarbes - Les Aubrais - Paris
local service (TER Nouvelle-Aquitaine) Bordeaux - Dax - Pau - Tarbes
local service (TER Nouvelle-Aquitaine) Bayonne - Pau - Tarbes

References

Railway stations in Pyrénées-Atlantiques